Half These Songs Are About You is the first album released by the band Nizlopi in August 2004. It includes the number one single, "JCB". Despite the duo nature of Nizlopi, this album is largely populated by full band tracks with real drums (instead of John Parker's human beatbox) and many other instruments. The songs therefore sound quite different live.

Track listing
 "Fine Story" – 3:35
 "Girls" – 3:55
 "Call It Up" – 3:36
 "Faith" – 3:03
 "Long Distance" – 3:37
 "JCB" – 3:47
 "Love Rage On" – 3:13
 "Freedom" – 4:12
 "Wash Away" – 3:50
 "Sing Around It" – 4:21
 "Worry" – 6:24

There is also a hidden track, "Intro Song", after "Worry".

Nizlopi albums
2004 debut albums